Cordtex is a type of detonating cord generally used in mining. It uses an explosive core of pentaerythritol tetranitrate (PETN) inside its plastic coating. 

It is commonly the thickness of electrical extension cord and has a detonation velocity of approximately 6000–7000 metres per second.  It is used to "daisychain" a sequence of explosives together.

It can also be used in short lengths in simple boobytraps and early warning devices.

See also
 Primacord

Detonators
Explosives